The Liberty of Peterborough Constabulary was the territorial police force responsible for law enforcement surrounding 'The Soke of Peterborough', England, from 1856 to 1947. It was initially controlled by the Chief Constable of Northamptonshire Captain Henry Lambert Bayly 1857 - 1876. The constabulary had a newly built headquarters on Thorpe Road in Peterborough that still stands today. The building is known as both the Old Gaol and Sessions House.

History

1856–1947 

Following the passing of the County and Borough Police Act 1856, the Liberty of Peterborough Constabulary was formed the following year on 10 March 1857. Later, in 1874, a Charter of Incorporation was granted to the City of Peterborough, prompting the Council to form a Watch Committee along with the Peterborough City Police.

Until 1947, the constabulary only officially used one helmet plate design, a day and a night plate, see photographs. In 1934, when flat caps were issued for officers assigned to motor patrols, the constabulary had some early badges chromed to save on purchase costs of new badges.  However, it is thought that only three chromed badges were produced. The day badge (photographed), is one such chromed badge. It is also known that when Liberty badges were in short supply due to breakages, wear and tear, then identical Northamptonshire badges were used as these were in plentiful supply. At that time Peterborough and the Soke were still within the county of Northamptonshire. Compare Badges

In 1914, the Constabulary had its own Special Constables but very little is known about this; only a badge exists, and it is only by the design of the badge that dating can be made.

These two forces, the Liberty of Peterborough Constabulary and the Peterborough City Police were combined on 1 April 1947 to form the Peterborough Combined Police Force.

1947–1965 

On 31 March 1965, five police forces in the Cambridgeshire area, the Peterborough Combined Police, Cambridge City Police, Cambridgeshire Constabulary, Huntingdonshire Constabulary and Isle of Ely Constabulary were amalgamated to form the Mid-Anglia Constabulary, headquartered in Brampton. The name changed again on 31 March 1974 to form today's Cambridgeshire Constabulary following alterations to the county boundaries.

Chief Constables of The Liberty of Peterborough
1857 - 1876 Captain Henry Lambert Bayly, also Chief Constable of Northamptonshire.
1876 - 1881 Thomas Orde Hastings Lees, also Chief Constable of Northamptonshire.
1881 - 1931 J.D. Kellie McCallum, also Chief Constable of Northamptonshire.
1931 - 1943 Thomas Danby, also Chief Constable of The Peterborough City Police.
1943 - 1947 Francis George Markin, also Chief Constable of The Peterborough City Police.

Constables of The Liberty of Peterborough
At the time of the amalgamation in 1947.

Police Constables: Jackson, Chapman, Palmby, Thursby, Willonsby, Bigg, Page, and Sergent Trundle.

Headquarters
The Old Gaol Thorpe Road Peterborough also known as the Sessions House.
Built in the year 1844 at a cost of some £8,000. It closed as a Gaol in 1878 and prisoners were transferred to Northampton or Cambridge.

See also
 Peterborough City Police
 Peterborough Combined Police
 Mid-Anglia Constabulary
 Cambridgeshire Constabulary
 Policing in the United Kingdom
 Soke of Peterborough

References

Booklet Commemorating 100 years of service of THE PETERBOROUGH POLICE 1857 - 1957. And The OFFICIAL OPENING OF THE NEW POLICE HEADQUARTERS Bridge Street Peterborough. Printed by the 'Peterborough Standard' 10/10a Church Street Peterborough.
Commemorating Booklet PDF

External links

Local government in Cambridgeshire
Defunct police forces of England
1836 establishments in England
Government agencies established in 1836
Organisations based in Peterborough